Alive 2 (2005) is the third full-length live album and second full-length live DVD from the band Anthrax. It features the reunion of their lineup from the Among the Living era, including then-former vocalist Joey Belladonna and former guitarist Dan Spitz. The songs included on the disc are taken from Fistful of Metal, their first release, until Persistence of Time (1990), spanning numerous personnel changes.

Unlike the band's previous live release, Music of Mass Destruction, the CD and DVD versions of Alive 2 are sold also separately or in "The Special Edition": in which the CD is referred to as Alive 2: The CD and the DVD is referred to as Alive 2: The DVD.

This album would be the last non-compilation release featuring Dan Spitz, who left the band following the end of Anthrax's reunion tour.

The footage was filmed on June 3, 2005 at the Starland Ballroom in Sayreville, N.J.

Track listing

The CD 
"Among the Living" – 5:29
"Caught in a Mosh" – 5:42
"A.I.R." – 6:22
"Antisocial" – 6:05
"Lone Justice" * – 4:32
"Efilnikufesin (N.F.L.)" – 5:59
"Deathrider" – 3:37
"Medusa" – 4:59
"In My World" – 6:09
"Indians" – 7:45
"Time" – 6:52
"Be All, End All" – 7:44
"I Am the Law" – 7:04

* Special edition only

The DVD 
"Among the Living" – 5:29
"Caught In a Mosh" – 5:42
"A.I.R." – 6:22
"Madhouse" – 6:05
"Efilnikufesin (N.F.L.)" – 5:59
"Deathrider" – 3:37
"Medusa" – 4:59
"In My World" – 6:09
"Indians" – 7:45
"Time" – 6:52
"I'm the Man" – 6:31
"Be All, End All" – 7:44
"I Am the Law" – 7:04

DVD Additional Content
Documentary
State of Euphoria
Juliya Interview
Touring Tales
The Vaccine

Personnel
Joey Belladonna – vocals
Dan Spitz– lead guitar
Scott Ian– guitar
Frank Bello– bass guitar
Charlie Benante- drums

References

Anthrax (American band) live albums
2005 live albums
2005 video albums
Live video albums
Sanctuary Records video albums
Sanctuary Records live albums